Jovanee Jarrett (born 15 January 1983) is a Jamaican long jumper.

She competed at the 2009 World Championships without reaching the final. Her personal best is 6.75 metres, achieved in June 2009 in Kingston, Jamaica.

Achievements

References

1983 births
Living people
Jamaican female long jumpers
Athletes (track and field) at the 2014 Commonwealth Games
Central American and Caribbean Games silver medalists for Jamaica
Competitors at the 2006 Central American and Caribbean Games
Competitors at the 2010 Central American and Caribbean Games
Central American and Caribbean Games medalists in athletics
Commonwealth Games competitors for Jamaica
20th-century Jamaican women
21st-century Jamaican women